Mar Chokka is a Bengali film directed Sopnil Khan produced by Moin Biswas and music by Ali Akram Shuvo. It is distributed by Jyoti Films International. Starring Omar Sani, Sadek Bachchu and Hero Alom. It was declared disaster film of the year.

Cast
Omar Sani
Hero Alom
Nerjon Raju
Sadek Bacchu
Alexander Bo

Soundtrack

The soundtrack was composed by Ali Akram Shuvo.

References

Films scored by Ali Akram Shuvo
2010s Bengali-language films
Bengali-language Bangladeshi films
2017 films